Melandrya is a genus of beetles belonging to the family Melandryidae.

The species of this genus are found in Europe, Japan and Northern America.

Species:
 Melandrya barbata (Fabricius, 1787)
 Melandrya caraboides (Linnaeus, 1760)

References

Melandryidae